Linagliptin, sold under the brand name Tradjenta among others, is a medication used to treat type 2 diabetes (but not type 1) in conjunction with exercise and diet. It is generally less preferred than metformin and sulfonylureas as an initial treatment. It is taken by mouth.

Common side effects include inflammation of the nose and throat. Serious side effects may include angioedema, pancreatitis, joint pain. Use in pregnancy and breastfeeding is not recommended. Linagliptin is a dipeptidyl peptidase-4 inhibitor that works by increasing the production of insulin and decreasing the production of glucagon by the pancreas.

Linagliptin was approved for medical use in the United States, Japan, the European Union, Canada, and Australia in 2011. In 2020, it was the 293rd most commonly prescribed medication in the United States, with more than 1million prescriptions. From August 2021 linagliptin became available as a generic medicine in the US.

Medical uses
Linagliptin is indicated as an adjunct to diet and exercise to improve glycemic control in adults with type 2 diabetes.

Side effects
Linagliptin may cause severe joint pain.

Mechanism of action 
Linagliptin belongs to a class of drugs called DPP-4 inhibitors.

Names
Linagliptin is the international nonproprietary name (INN). Trade names: Trajenta, Tradjenta.

See also 
 Empagliflozin/linagliptin

References

External links

 

Alkyne derivatives
Boehringer Ingelheim
Dipeptidyl peptidase-4 inhibitors
Eli Lilly and Company brands
Piperidines
Quinazolines
Xanthines
Wikipedia medicine articles ready to translate